Lucha Capital (Spanish for "Capital Fight") is a Mexican seasonal professional wrestling streaming television series and tournament produced by Lucha Libre AAA Worldwide (AAA). Like all professional wrestling events, it is based on scripted storylines and its outcomes are predetermined. The show premiered on October 31, 2018, on Facebook Watch.

On October 9, 2019, AAA announced Season 2 of the Lucha Capital.

Bracket

Men's

Women's

References

External links

Facebook Watch original programming
2018 Mexican television series debuts
2019 Mexican television series endings
Spanish-language television shows
American non-fiction web series